Begum Parveen Sultana (born May 1950) is an Indian Hindustani classical singer of the Patiala Gharana. She was awarded the Padma Shri in 1976 and the Padma Bhushan in 2014 by the Government of India and the Sangeet Natak Akademi Award by the Sangeet Natak Akademi in 1998.

Career
Begum Parveen Sultana received training from Acharya Chinmoy Lahiri, among others. Begum Parveen Sultana started her professional career with Abdul Majid's Assamese Film Morom Trishna. She has sung for Bollywood movies such as Gadar, Kudrat, Do Boond Pani, and Pakeezah, and several other Assamese films. Recently, she sang the theme song of Vikram Bhatt's 1920. She also sang Humein Tumse Pyaar Kitna for the film Kudrat in 1981.

She has recorded for HMV, Polydor, Music India, Bharat Records, Auvidis, Magnasound, Sonodisc, and Amigo.

Personal life 
She is married to Ustad Dilshad Khan from whom she also took lessons of music. They have one daughter named Shadab Khan.

Awards and recognition
 Gandharva Kalanidhi, 1980
 Miyan Tansen Prize, 1986
 Sangeet Samraggi conferred by the Assam Government, 1994
 Filmfare Best Female Playback Award--Kudrat (1981) for the song "Hame Tumse Pyar Kitna"
 Sangeet Natak Akademi Award, 1999
 Srimant Sankardev award by the Assam government
 2014: Padma Bhushan by Government of India

Discography
 An hour of Ecstasy (Raga Madhuwanti/Raga Gorakh Kalyan/Raga Mishra Bhairavi thumri/Bhajan)
 Narayani (Raga Narayani)
 Ghazals
 Young Voices of India (Modern Ghazals)- Maikada se utha ke pila Saaqiya
 Begum Parveen Sultana- (Raga Salag Varali todi/Raga Lalita/ Raga Khamaj thumri)
 Enchanting Bhajans (Raga Rageshri/Bhajan/Bhajan/Bhajan)
 Ethereal Duo- with Dilshad Khan (Raga Marwa/Raga Kaushi Nat/Raga Mishra Bhairavi thumri)
 Genius of Parveen Sultana (Raga Kalavati/Raga Rageshri/Hori thumri/Malhar Mala bhajan)
 Homage to Guru (Raga Shyam Kauns/Raga Shuddh Sarang/Raga Mishra Kafi hori thumri)
 Impeccable Soprano Parveen Sultana & Innovative Tenor Dilshad Khan- with Dilshad Khan (Raga Rageshri/Raga Hansdhwani)
 Innovation Greets Tradition (Raga Sarang Kauns/Raga Miya ki Malhar)
 Khayal & Thumri (Raga Kusumi Kalyan/Raga Mangal Bhairav/Raga Bhairavi thumri)
 Marvellous Jugalbandi- with Dilshad Khan (Raga Bhatiyaar/Raga Kaushi Kanada)
 Megh-Manavi (Raga Megh/Raga Manavi/Raag Hemant thumri)
 One Plus One...In Harmony- with Dilshad Khan (Raga Multani/Raga Puriya Dhanashri)
 Le Chant Khayal de Parveen Sultana et Dilshad Khan- with Dilshad Khan (Raga Kalavati/Raga Megh Malhar/Raga Bageshri/Raga Mishra Pahadi thumri)
 Two Voices- with Dilshad Khan (Raga Puriya Dhanashri/Raga Hansdhwani/Raga Bhairavi sadra)
 Phenomenal Performance (Raga Ahir Bhairav/Raga Nand Kauns/Raga Bhairavi sadra)
 Parveen Sultana Sings Rare Melodies (Raga Rajni Kalyan/Raga Deen Todi)
 Khayal Se Bhajan Tak- with Dilshad Khan (Vol 1 to Vol 4)
 Duologue in Raga- with Dilshad Khan (Raga Kedar bhajan/Raga Leelavati/Raga Rageshri/Raga Todi) 1992
 From Dawn Until Night (De l'aube à la nuit) – with Dilshad Khan (Raga Gujri todi/Raga Kuvalaya Bhairav/Raga Ambika Sarang/Raga Bhoopali tarana/Raga Amba Manohari/Raga Jog/Raga Mishra Bhairavi thumri/Meera bhajan/Brahmanand bhajan) 1995
 Parveen (Raga Rageshri/Raga Mishra Mand) 2004
 Simply Divine (Raga Puriya Dhanashri/Raga Mishra Khamaj thumri/Raga Mishra Kedar bhajan) 2004
 Maestro's Choice Parveen Sultana (Raga Maru Bihag/Raga Amba Manohari/Raga Hansdhwani tarana) 2006
 Safar (Raga Maru Bihag/Raga Hansdhwani tarana/Raga Bhairavi sadra/Meera bhajan/Sai bhajan)
 Live from Savai Gandharva Music Festival (Raga Gujri todi/Raga Jaunpuri/Kabir Bhajan); (Raga Jog/Raga Gurjri todi/Marathi song); (Raga Lalit/Raga Komal Bhairav)
 Par Excellence (Raga Madhuwanti/Raga Jog/Raga Maluha Mand) 2011
 Zen Harmony (Raga Gujri todi/Meera Bhajan)

Filmography
Parween Sultana also lent her voice to several songs in films throughout the years.

 Pakeezah - Kaun gali gayo Shyam, Ban ban bole Koyaliya
 Do Boond Paani - Pital ki meri Gaagri
 Parwana - Piya ki gali
 Mukti Asm (1973 Assamese film) - Sakhiyoti Jhilmil Paakhi
 Sonma (Assamese) - Notun Tomaar Chorandhani
 Khoj - Ram kare mora Saiyaa ho aise
 Razia Sultan - Shubh Ghadi aayi re
 Ashray (the Shelter) – Shab-e-Intezaar mein kyu hai Gumsum Tamannaaye, Ae Mohabbat yu hi to tu Badnaam nahi, Dev puji puji Hindu muye
 Preet (1972; unreleased) - Yaad Sataaye din rain Mitwaa 
 Tohfa Mohabbat ka - Prem ka Granth Padhaau
 Shaadi kar lo - Na tum hato...na tum hate (Qawwali)
 Vijeta - Bichhurat mose Kanha
 Kalankini Kankabati (Bengali) - Bedechhi Beena gaan Shonaabo
 Sharda - Yeh Bahut Khushi ki Nishaani hai
 Kudrat - Hame tum se Pyaar Kitna
 Anmol - Koi ishq ka rog
 Gadar: Ek Prem Katha - Aan milo Sajna (Thumri)
 1920 – Vaada tum se hai Vaada

References

External links

 Parveen Sultana
  from The Assam Tribune

Hindustani singers
Recipients of the Sangeet Natak Akademi Award
1960 births
Indian Muslims
Singers from Assam
Living people
Place of birth missing (living people)
Assamese playback singers
Indian women playback singers
Recipients of the Padma Shri in arts
Recipients of the Padma Bhushan in arts
Women Hindustani musicians
20th-century Indian singers
20th-century Indian women singers
Indian women classical singers
Women musicians from Assam
21st-century Indian women singers
21st-century Indian singers
People from Nagaon district
G-Series (record label) artists
20th-century Khyal singers
Filmfare Awards winners